Ram Prit Paswan is an Indian Politician and Minister of Public Health Engineering Department Government of Bihar. He is a member of the Bharatiya Janata Party from Bihar. He has won the Bihar Legislative Assembly election in 2010, 2015 and 2020 from Rajnagar constituency.

Paswan is presently MLA as well as Sabhapati (Zero Hour) of Bihar Legislative Assembly and also holds a doctorate from Lalit Narayan Mithila University (LNMU-Darbhanga).

References

Living people
People from Madhubani district
Bharatiya Janata Party politicians from Bihar
Bihar MLAs 2010–2015
Bihar MLAs 2015–2020
Samata Party politicians
Bihar MLAs 2020–2025
State cabinet ministers of Bihar
1963 births
Lok Janshakti Party politicians